Bisi may refer to:

Given name
 Bifus or Bisi (f. 670), English bishop
 Bisi Adeleye-Fayemi (born 1963), British-Nigerian activist and author
 Bisi Afolabi (born 1975), female track and field athlete from Nigeria
 Bisi Akande (1939, ??), governor of Osun State
 Bisi Alimi (born 1975), Nigerian activist
 Bisi Ezerioha (born 1972), American racing driver and engineer 
 Bisi Komolafe (1986–2012), Nigerian actress, film director and producer
 Bisi Olateru-Olagbegi (1953-2015), Nigeria activist and Director of the Women Consortium of Nigeria 
 Bisi Onabanjo (1927-1990), governor of Ogun State in Nigeria 
 Bisi Onasanya (born 1961), Nigerian banker
 Bisi Silva, Nigerian art curator

Surname
 Adriana Bisi Fabbri (1881-1918), Italian painter
 Anna Maria Bisi (1938–1988), Italian archaeologist and academic
 Fra Bonaventura Bisi (1601-1659), Italian painter
 Cumali Bişi (born 1993), Turkish professional footballer 
 Emilio Bisi (1850–1920), Italian sculptor
 Ernesta Legnani Bisi (1788–1859), Italian painter and engraver
 Fulvia Bisi (1818-1911), Italian landscape painter
 Giuseppe Bisi (1787-1869), Italian painter of landscapes in a Romantic style
 Luigi Bisi (1814-1886), Italian architect and painter
 Martin Bisi (born 1961), American producer and songwriter
 Michele Bisi (1788–?), Italian engraver and painter
 Paolo Bisi (born 1964), Italian comic book artist
 Patrizia Bisi, Italian writer of Daimon

Other
 Bisi Bele Bath, Indian rice-based dish
 Bisi, KwaZulu-Natal, municipality in the KwaZulu-Natal province of South Africa
Bisi, Daughter of the River, highest grossing Nigerian film